A potent magnitude 6.6 Mw intraplate aftershock occurred at 17:16 JST (08:16 UTC) on 11 April, in the Hamadōri region of Fukushima, Japan. It was one of many aftershocks to follow the 11 March Tōhoku earthquake, and the strongest to have its epicentre located inland.

The earthquake occurred as a result of normal faulting to the west of Iwaki, and triggered numerous landslides across adjacent mountainous areas. A few fires broke out, and 220,000 households lost electricity. Officials issued localised tsunami alerts, though no significant waves were generated. The earthquake caused little structural damage, but killed four people and injured ten others. The strong ground movements triggered the reactivation of a nearby geological fault, prompting researchers to conduct extensive surveys in the region.

Geology
To the east of the epicentre, the oceanic Pacific Plate is subducted beneath the continental Okhotsk Plate, on which much of Honshu's Tōhoku region is situated. Building stress near the resultant plate boundary has led to the development of shallow inland faults through crustal deformation and folding along the east coast of Tōhoku. This intraplate earthquake occurred in the vicinity of the Idosawa Fault – a shallow crustal fault in the Hamadōri region near Tabito town, Iwaki city, that had previously been inactive.

The segments of the Idosawa Fault associated with this surface feature were classified as the "Shionohira Fault" in 2011. The nearby Yunodake Fault, a normal dip-slip fault northeast of the Shionohira Fault that had been dormant for 120,000–130,000 years, also ruptured during the quake. These observations indicated that the earthquake occurred as a result of normal dip-slip faulting with some strike-slip component.

The magnitude 9.0 Mw earthquake triggered widespread seismic activity, and its aftershock sequence includes well-over 67 earthquakes of magnitude 6.0 Mw or greater. Apart from the Fukushima Hamadōri earthquake, four of the aftershocks measured magnitude 7.0 Mw or higher. The Fukushima Hamadōri earthquake, however, was the strongest of the aftershocks to have its epicentre located inland. Early estimates placed the strength of the earthquake at a magnitude of 7.0–7.1, but the United States Geological Survey (USGS) lowered the magnitude to 6.6.

The Fukushima Hamadōri earthquake was succeeded by a number of smaller tremors; that same day, at least 11 earthquakes of magnitude 3.5 Mj or higher were recorded near its epicentre. Of the series, the strongest registered at a magnitude of 5.5 Mj and occurred within 3.5 hours after the initial quake. A shallow magnitude 6.0 Mw (6.4 Mj) earthquake and several smaller tremors struck the region on 12 April.

Effects

The earthquake struck in the late afternoon near a moderately populated region of the Fukushima Prefecture, although most structures around the epicentre were resistant to earthquake shaking. Focussed at an unusually shallow depth, the earthquake generated significant shaking throughout many adjacent prefectures. The strongest ground motion registered at severe (MM VIII) in Ishikawa town on the Mercalli intensity scale. Strong shaking (MM VI) spread through Iwaki, Sukawaga, Kuroiso, Ōtawara and Kitaibaraki, with light tremors (MM IV) felt in areas up to several hundred kilometres from the epicentre, including Tokyo and Yokohama. The earthquake cut electricity to about 220,000 households, with most of the cuts reported in Iwaki city. Workers at the Fukushima Daiichi power plant – distanced  from the epicentre – evacuated to safety, and external power to the plant was cut. The outage briefly disrupted cooling water injections into three of the reactors, but services to the plant were restored by 18:05 JST. Authorities at Tokyo International Airport closed all runways momentarily, while NTT DoCoMo restricted voice calls in 14 prefectures following the quake. East Japan Railway Company temporarily suspended its services to restart four of five bullet-train lines; other Shinkansen bullet trains in the region were also halted.

The earthquake sparked several fires in Iwaki, with one fire breaking out in Asakawa town. Fire engines extinguished a blaze in a liquefied natural gas tank at Daiichi Sankyo's Onahama Plant. Most of the structural damage was due to scattered rock- and landslides along hillsides in the vicinity of Iwaki. A landslide crushed two vehicles and buried three homes in the city, trapping a number of the inhabitants. The incident resulted in two immediate deaths. Four people were critically injured and taken to hospital; one of them was later pronounced dead. Significant land deformation with traces of uplift was observed in and around town, affecting local roads but largely sparing its structures.

A total of seven people from other regions near the epicentre, including southern Ibaraki, Tochigi and Kanagawa prefectures, suffered minor injuries. Another person was injured during the magnitude 6.0 (Mw) aftershock of 12 April. In a report from July 2011, the Fire and Disaster Management Agency confirmed a death toll of four from the earthquake.

Response
Japan's Earthquake Early Warning system was activated upon the detection of primary waves – seismic waves that forego an earthquake's perceivable ground motions – giving residents 6.8 seconds to seek cover before the main shock. At the risk of a tsunami – which reach their destructive wave heights near shallow coastal waters – local fishing boats along coastlines were shown heading out to sea on national news broadcasts. In response to the earthquake, the fire department dispatched search and rescue teams and emergency crews for relief efforts and damage assessments throughout the affected area. Six medical crews in pairs of two were also sent to Kanagawa, Chiba and Gunma prefectures. Former Prime Minister Naoto Kan postponed a press conference scheduled for 17:50 JST marking the one-month anniversary of the catastrophic Tōhoku earthquake and tsunami.

The Fukushima Hamadōri earthquake occurred in a region with historically low levels of seismicity; studies showed that the recent activity near the fault zone had been triggered by the Tōhoku earthquake. Ever since the earthquake triggered their reactivation, the Shionohira and Yunodake faults have provided essential data for local geological surveys on regional land deformation, sedimentary rock distribution and landslide vulnerability. In the earthquake's aftermath, Professor Yagi Hiroshi from the Faculty of Education, Art and Science noted that "a possibility exists for widespread aftershocks of the same size to occur in the near future."

See also 
List of earthquakes in 2011
List of earthquakes in Japan
2016 Fukushima earthquake
2021 Fukushima earthquake

References

External links
 Japan hit with 6.6 aftershock – CBS News
 Earthquake M6.6 - eastern Honshu, Japan – United States Geological Survey

Earthquakes of the Heisei period
2011 earthquakes
April 2011 events in Japan
Landslides in Japan
Earthquakes in Fukushima Prefecture
2011 disasters in Japan